The Pottawattamie County Jail, also known as 'Squirrel Cage Jail' in Council Bluffs, Iowa, United States was built in 1885 and it was listed on the National Register of Historic Places in 1972.  The building is a Squirrel Cage Jail, also known as a Rotary Jail.

History
Construction of the jail was simultaneous with that of the county's new courthouse, which was finished in 1888. It was designed by William H. Brown and Benjamin F. Haugh of Indianapolis, Indiana at a cost of $30,000. 

The building was one of 18 such jails that were built in the United States and the only one that was three stories tall. Also known as 'Squirrel Cage Jail', it was one of a handful of rotary jails built in the Midwestern America in the mid-19th century. The building was designed for maximum security with minimal contact between the prisoners and the jailers. The front part of the jail had offices for the jailer, a kitchen, trustee cells, and quarters for women. The rest of the building is made up of pie-shaped cells that revolved inside of a cage. These dangerous cells also rotated inside a cylindrical cage with only one opening, which resulted in the loss of many prisoners' limbs.  

The building was used as a jail until its closure in 1969. In 1971, the Council Bluffs Park Board acquired the building, and in 1977, the county historical society took ownership of the building and maintains it as a museum.

In popular culture

Television
The Pottawattamie County Jail was featured as a haunted location in a special episode of Ghost Adventures in 2019 titled, "Serial Killer Spirits: Axe-Killer Jail" which aired on the Travel Channel.

Radio
The jail was also referenced in an old time radio program Gang Busters, in the episode Gang Busters - The Case of John K. Giles, which originally aired September 29 1945.  In the episode John K. Giles is reportedly captured and sent to the "Pottawattamie Prison", a special jail with impregnable bars and microphones in the wall.  The escape artist fashioned a key out of a sharpened utensil and was able to unlock the cell door to get free.

References

External links
 Squirrel Cage Jail - Historical Society of Pottawattamie County

Government buildings completed in 1885
Museums in Council Bluffs, Iowa
National Register of Historic Places in Pottawattamie County, Iowa
Jails on the National Register of Historic Places in Iowa
Prison museums in the United States
History museums in Iowa
Jails in Iowa